Verder is the third album by Dutch rappers Lange Frans & Baas B.  It was released on 23 April 2008, three years after their previous album Het Land Van.  Apart from a song  related to politics ("Kamervragen"), there is a heartbreaking song titled "Waar Ik Sta" ("Where I Stand").

The album reached number 56 in the Dutch top 100 charts and remained in the charts for five weeks.  The single Kamervragen released on February 4, 2008 reached number 14 in the Dutch charts.

Track listing

Charts

Singles

References

2008 albums
Lange Frans & Baas B albums